Bhadra Maruti Mandir is a Mandir in Khuldabad, near Chhtrapati Sambhaji Nagar, Maharashtra, India. The deity of the temple is lord Hanuman.

It is located on the distance of 4 Km from the Ellora Caves.

At this temple, the idol of Hanuman is portrayed in a reclining or sleeping posture. It is one of only three places where Hanuman is represented in a sleeping posture. The second noted place is a temple on the banks of Ganga at sangam in Allahabad and Uttar Pradesh and the third is at Jam Sawali, Madhya Pradesh.

The Bhadra Maruti Temple is one of the famous tourist attractions and pilgrimage centre in Chhatrapati Sambhaji Nagar area, lakhs of Hindu devotees arrive at this temple  during the auspicious occasions of Hanuman Jayanti and Ram Navami. People from chhatrapati Sambhaji Nagar and nearby villages walk to the temple to take darshan and do puja–aarti of lord Bajrangbali on Saturdays in the Hindu calendar month of "Shraavana" There is rush and lots of crowd during Saturdays and Thursday in the mandir every week.

History
In the medieval time when the region where this mandir is situated won by Mughal, the mandir was destroyed. It is said that however the Murti was saved and some people successfully kept it hidden for lots of years. In 1960's some people started the movement to relocate the Murti at its original location. They built a mandir made up of marbal stones.

Folklore  
According to a folklore, in ancient times the Khuldabad was known as Bhadravati and the ruler was a noble king named Bhadrasena, who was an ardent devotee of Rama and used to sing songs in His praise. One day Hanumanji descended in the place, listening to the devotional songs sung in praise of Rama.  He was mesmerized and without his knowledge took a reclining posture – called 'Bhava-samadhi' (Bhava samadhi is a yogic posture). King Bhadrasen, when he had finished his song, was astonished to find Hanuman in Samadhi before him. He requested Hanuman to reside there forever and bless his and Lord Rama's devotees.

References

Hanuman temples
Religious buildings and structures in Aurangabad, Maharashtra
Hindu temples in Maharashtra